Bunkpurugu is a small town and is the capital of Bunkpurugu Nyankpanduri district, a district in the North East Region of Ghana adjacent to the border with Togo. It was formerly the capital of the Bunkpurugu-Yunyoo District.

References

Populated places in the North East Region (Ghana)